Christian Herman Winkelmann (September 12, 1883 – November 19, 1946) was an American prelate of the Roman Catholic Church. He served as Bishop of Wichita from 1940 to 1946.  He previously served as an auxiliary bishop of the Archdiocese of St. Louis in Missouri from 1933 to 1940.

Biography

Early life 
Christian Winkelmann was born on September 12, 1883, in St. Louis, Missouri, to John and Anna (née Becker) Winkelmann. He attended St. Francis Solanus College in Quincy, Illinois, then returned to Missouri to enter Kenrick Seminary in St. Louis. 

Winkelmann was ordained to the priesthood for the Archdiocese of St. Louis on June 11, 1907. He then served as curate at St. Peter's Parish in St. Charles, Missouri, until 1922, when he became pastor of Sacred Heart Parish in Rich Fountain, Missouri. Winkelmann was pastor of St. Francis de Sales Parish in St. Louis from 1929 to 1939.

Auxiliary Bishop of St. Louis 
On September 13, 1933, Winkelmann was appointed the first auxiliary bishop of the Archdiocese of St. Louis and Titular Bishop of Sita by Pope Pius XI. He received his episcopal consecration on November 30, 1933, from Archbishop John J. Glennon, with Bishops Thomas Lillis and Francis Johannes serving as co-consecrators.

Bishop of Wichita 
Following the death of Bishop Augustus Schwertner, Winkelmann was named the third bishop of the Diocese of Wichita by Pius XII on December 27, 1939. He was installed at Wichita on March 5, 1940. 

Christian Winkelmann died in Wichita on November 19, 1946, at age 63.

References

1883 births
1946 deaths
Quincy University alumni
American people of German descent
Kenrick–Glennon Seminary alumni
Clergy from St. Louis
Roman Catholic bishops of Wichita
20th-century Roman Catholic bishops in the United States
Roman Catholic Archdiocese of St. Louis
Religious leaders from Missouri